Still of the Night is a 1982 American neo-noir psychological thriller film directed by Robert Benton and starring Roy Scheider, Meryl Streep, Joe Grifasi, and Jessica Tandy. It was written by Benton and David Newman. Scheider plays a psychiatrist who falls in love with a woman (Streep) who may be the psychopathic killer of one of his patients.

The film is considered as an overt homage to the films of Alfred Hitchcock, emulating scenes from many of his movies: a bird attacks one character (as in The Birds), a scene takes place in an auction (as in North by Northwest), someone falls from a height (as in Vertigo and a number of other films), stuffed birds occupy a room (as in Psycho), and an important plot point is the interpretation of a dream (as in Spellbound). Meryl Streep's hair is styled much like Eva Marie Saint's was in North by Northwest, and the town of Glen Cove features in both films. Jessica Tandy also features both in this film, and in The Birds (1963) as the mother of the protagonist.

Plot

Manhattan psychiatrist Dr. Sam Rice is visited by glamorous, enigmatic Brooke Reynolds, who works at Crispin's (a fictitious New York auction house modeled after Christie's). Brooke was having an affair with one of Rice's patients, George Bynum, who has just been murdered. Brooke asks the doctor to return a watch to Bynum's wife and not reveal the affair.

Sam is visited by NYPD Detective Joseph Vitucci but refuses to give any information on Bynum, a patient for two years.  After the police warn him that he could become a target because the killer may believe he knows something, Sam reviews the case files detailing Bynum's affairs with various women at Crispin's, including Brooke. Bynum had also expressed concern, claiming a wealthy friend had once killed someone, and Bynum was the only person who knew about this. He wondered if this friend might kill again.

The police believe Bynum's killer is a woman. Sam gradually falls for Brooke but believes he is being followed. He is mugged by someone who takes his coat, whereupon the mugger is killed in the same manner as Bynum.

Sam tries to interpret clues from the case file with his psychiatrist mother, Grace, including a strange dream of Bynum's in which he finds a green box in a cabinet in a dark house and is then chased up a narrow staircase by a little girl carrying a bleeding teddy bear.

Brooke's behavior becomes increasingly suspicious. Sam tails her to a family estate on Long Island. She explains her guilt in the accidental death of her father, and claims Bynum threatened to reveal this secret if she broke off their affair.

Sam pieces together that Bynum's previous girlfriend was Gail Phillips, an assistant to Bynum at Crispin's. Gail blames Brooke for her breakup with Bynum. Gail, trying to frame Brooke, kills Det. Vitucci. Now she arrives at the estate to kill Brooke and Sam.

As they are about to leave, Brooke forgets her keys and goes back into the dark house, alone, to retrieve them, while Sam waits in his car. Gail appears in the back seat of the car and stabs Sam with a knife. Gail then chases Brooke through the house, recapitulating Bynum's dream. Brooke narrowly escapes, as Gail falls to her death over a railing. Sam is not seriously hurt and is embraced by Brooke.

Cast
 Roy Scheider as Dr. Sam Rice
 Meryl Streep as Brooke Reynolds
 Jessica Tandy as Dr. Grace Rice
 Joe Grifasi as Joseph Vitucci
 Sara Botsford as Gail Phillips
 Josef Sommer as George Bynum
 Rikke Borge as Heather Wilson
 Irving Metzman as Murray Gordon
 Larry Joshua as Mugger  
 Tom Norton as Auctioneer  
 Richmond Hoxie as Mr. Harris  
 Hyon Cho as Mr. Chang  
 Danielle Cusson as Girl  
 John Eric Bentley as Night Watchman  
 George A. Tooks as Elevator Operator

Production
Filming took place in March 1981. Still of the Night was filmed in and around New York City, including at Columbia University, the Trefoil Arch and the Boathouse Cafe in Central Park, and the Museum of the City of New York.

Art dealer Arne Glimcher served as a consultant on the film and helped choreograph the auction scene (as well as playing a cameo role as an art dealer who bids against the Streep character). Thomas E. Norton, who had been a long-time executive at Sotheby's, served as a consultant for the film. (He also played the auctioneer taking bids during the Crispin's auction scene.) The auction scene was filmed in the auditorium of the International House of New York.

Reception

Box office 
The film had a platform release on five screens and grossed $548,255 before going wide on 502 screens on December 17, 1982, but it disappointed with only $633,273 for the weekend. Altogether, the film made $5,979,947 domestically, on a budget of $10 million.

Critical reaction 
Still of the Night holds an aggregate score of 67% fresh on the website Rotten Tomatoes.

A review in Variety stated: "It comes as almost a shock to see a modern suspense picture that's as literate, well acted and beautifully made as Still of The Night. Despite its many virtues, however, Robert Benton's film [...] has its share of serious flaws, mainly in the area of plotting".

In his review for The New York Times, Vincent Canby explained that the screenplay "makes inescapable references to such Hitchcock classics as 'Vertigo,' 'Rear Window,' 'North by Northwest' and 'Spellbound,' among others."

In 2013, Meryl Streep stated it was one of the worst movies in which she had acted.

References

External links
 
 
 
 
 

1982 films
1980s English-language films
Films directed by Robert Benton
1980s psychological thriller films
American neo-noir films
American detective films
Films with screenplays by Robert Benton
Films about psychiatry
Metro-Goldwyn-Mayer films
United Artists films
1980s American films